Aksara Records was a Jakarta-based independent record label, founded in 2004 by Hanindhito Siddharta and David Tarigan. Its logo was a cartooned crow holding a beamed notes in its mouth.

The label name came from Indonesian word "aksara" which in English means "alphabet".

Aksara Records is one of the largest independent music label in Indonesia.
This record label was shut down by the owners, due to financial problems in 2009. All the remaining Mastered records in the label were given to the artists.

One of the co-owners of Aksara Records, opened another independent label called Raksasa Records.

Artists
 Sore (band)
 White Shoes & The Couples Company

See also
 List of record labels

External links
 Official site
 Aksara Records on MySpace

Indie pop record labels
Rock record labels
Pop record labels
Indonesian independent record labels
Record labels established in 2004
Record labels disestablished in 2009
2004 establishments in Indonesia
2009 establishments in Indonesia